This is the order of battle for the invasion of Iraq during the Iraq War between coalition forces and Iraqi forces supported by Fedayeen Saddam irregulars and others between March 19 and May 1, 2003.

Coalition Forces Land Component Command

Lieutenant General David D. McKiernan, Commanding.

I Marine Expeditionary Force
 1st Marine Division (reinforced)
 1st Marine Regiment
3rd BN, 1st Marine Regiment
1st BN, 4th Marine Regiment
2nd BN, 23rd Marine Regiment
2nd Light Armored Recon Battalion
5th Marine Regiment
1st BN, 5th Marine Regiment
2nd BN, 5th Marine Regiment
3rd BN, 5th Marine Regiment
2nd Tank Battalion
1st Light Armored Recon Battalion
7th Marine Regiment
1st BN, 7th Marine Regiment
3rd BN, 7th Marine Regiment
3rd BN, 4th Marine Regiment
1st Tank Battalion
3rd Light Armored Recon Battalion
11th Marine Regiment
1st BN, 11th Marine Regiment (155T)
2nd BN, 11th Marine Regiment (155T)
3rd BN, 11th Marine Regiment (155T)
5th BN, 11th Marine Regiment (155T)
3rd BN, 27th Field Artillery Regiment (MLRS)
1st Reconnaissance Battalion
2nd Assault Amphibian Battalion
3rd Assault Amphibian Battalion
 2nd Marine Expeditionary Brigade (TF Tarawa) (BGen Natonski)
2nd Marine Regiment
1st BN, 2nd Marine Regiment
3rd BN, 2nd Marine Regiment
2nd BN, 8th Marine Regiment
1st BN, 10th Marine Regiment (155T)
15th Marine Expeditionary Unit (SOC)
2nd BN, 1st Marine Regiment
S Btry, 5-11 Marine Regiment (155T)
24th Marine Expeditionary Unit
2nd BN, 2nd Marine Regiment
F Btry, 2-10 Marine Regiment (155T)
1st (UK) Armoured Division
 7th Armoured Brigade
Royal Scots Dragoon Guards (Armor)
2nd Royal Tank Regiment (Armor)
1st BN, Black Watch (Mech)
1st BN, Royal Regiment of Fusiliers (Mech)
3rd Regiment Royal Horse Artillery (155SP)
 16 Air Assault Brigade
1st BN, Parachute Regiment
3rd BN, Parachute Regiment
1st BN, Royal Irish Regiment (Air Aslt)
7th Parachute Regiment Royal Horse Artillery (105T)
 3 Commando Brigade
40 Commando
42 Commando
29 Commando Regiment Royal Artillery (105T)

V Corps (LTG Wallace)
 3rd Infantry Division (Mech)
1st Brigade
2nd BN, 7th Infantry Regiment (Mech)
3rd BN, 7th Infantry Regiment (Mech)
3rd BN, 69th Armor Regiment
1st BN, 41st Field Artillery Regiment (155SP)
2nd Brigade
3rd SQN, 7th Cavalry Regiment (Mech)
3rd BN, 15th Infantry Regiment (Mech)
1st BN, 64th Armor Regiment
4th BN, 64th Armor Regiment
1st BN, 9th Field Artillery Regiment (155SP)
3rd Brigade
1st BN, 15th Infantry Regiment (Mech)
1st BN, 30th Infantry Regiment (Mech)
2nd BN, 69th Armor Regiment
1st BN, 10th Field Artillery Regiment (155SP)
 101st Airborne Division (Air Aslt)
2nd Brigade
1st BN, 502nd Infantry Regiment (Air Aslt)
2nd BN, 502nd Infantry Regiment (Air Aslt)
3rd BN, 502nd Infantry Regiment (Air Aslt)
2nd BN, 70th Armor Regiment – Detached from 1st Armored Division
1st BN, 320th Field Artillery Regiment (Air Aslt) (105T)
3rd Brigade
1st BN, 187th Infantry Regiment (Air Aslt)
2nd BN, 187th Infantry Regiment (Air Aslt)
3rd BN, 187th Infantry Regiment (Air Aslt)
3rd BN, 320th Field Artillery Regiment (Air Aslt) (105T)
326th Engineer Battalion (Air Aslt)
101st Combat Aviation Brigade
159th Combat Aviation Brigade
 82nd Airborne Division
2nd Brigade
1st BN, 325th Infantry Regiment (Abn)
3rd BN, 325th Infantry Regiment (Abn)
1st BN, 41st Infantry Regiment (Mech) – Detached from 1st Armored Division
2nd BN, 319th Field Artillery Regiment  (Abn) (105T)
1st Brigade, 101st Airborne Division
1st BN, 327th Infantry Regiment (Air Aslt)
3rd BN, 327th Infantry Regiment (Air Aslt)
2nd BN, 320th Field Artillery Regiment (Air Aslt) (105T)
 4th Infantry Division (Mech) – Unable invade through Turkey in the north due to failed diplomacy, 4ID was forced to wait for vehicles to arrive in Kuwait, before sprinting north to Baghdad. 4ID was quick to discover all lead elements had exhausted mission essential resources and placed the invasion in serious jeopardy of stalling. Unwilling to give up the momentum, 4ID distributed their supplies between the divisions and continued the push north alone.
1st Brigade
1st BN, 8th Infantry Regiment (Mech) – Detached From 3rd Brigade
1st BN, 22nd Infantry Regiment (Mech)
1st BN, 44th Air Defense Artillery Regiment (United States)
1st BN, 66th Armor Regiment
3rd BN 66th Armor Regiment
4th BN, 42nd Field Artillery Regiment (155SP)
2nd Brigade
2nd BN, 8th Infantry Regiment (Mech)
1st BN, 67th Armor Regiment
3rd BN, 67th Armor Regiment
3rd BN, 16th Field Artillery Regiment (155SP)
3d Brigade
1st BN, 12th Infantry Regiment (Mech)
1st BN, 68th Armor Regiment
3rd BN, 29th Field Artillery Regiment (155SP)
Corps Asset
 28th Combat Support Hospital
 130th Engineer Brigade
265th Engineer Group
52nd Engineer Battalion (CBT HVY)
122nd Engineer Battalion (CORPS Wheeled)
864th Engineer Battalion (CBT HVY)
565th Engineer Battalion (PROV)
142nd Engineer Battalion (CBT HVY)
489th Engineer Battalion (CBT MECH)
878th Engineer Battalion (CBT HVY)
 17th Field Artillery Brigade
5th BN, 3rd Field Artillery Regiment (MLRS)
1st BN, 12th Field Artillery Regiment (MLRS)
3rd BN, 18th Field Artillery Regiment (155SP)
 41st Field Artillery Brigade
2nd BN, 18th Field Artillery Regiment (MLRS)
1st BN, 27th Field Artillery Regiment (MLRS)
 214th Field Artillery Brigade
2nd BN, 4th Field Artillery Regiment (MLRS)
 18th Military Police Brigade
211th Military Police Battalion
503rd Military Police Battalion
519th Military Police Battalion
709th Military Police Battalion
720th Military Police Battalion
 205th Military Intelligence Brigade
15th Military Intelligence Battalion
165th Military Intelligence Battalion
223rd Military Intelligence Battalion
302nd Military Intelligence Battalion
325th Military Intelligence Battalion
519th Military Intelligence Battalion
 22nd Signal Brigade
17th Signal Battalion
32nd Signal Battalion
44th Signal Battalion
51st Signal Battalion
440th Signal Battalion

Special Operations Command Central
Combined Joint Special Operations Task Force-North (TF Viking)
 10th Special Forces Group
 173rd Airborne Brigade – Conducted a parachute drop into northern Iraq on March 26, 2003
1st BN, 508th Infantry Regiment (Abn)
2nd BN, 503rd Infantry Regiment (Abn)
1st BN, 63rd Armor Regiment – (1st Infantry Division), Attached
D Btry, 319th Field Artillery Regiment (Abn) (105T)
2nd BN, 15th Field Artillery Regiment (105T) – (10th Mountain Division), attached
2nd BN, 14th Infantry Regiment – (10th Mountain Division), Attached minus Charlie Company
26th Marine Expeditionary Unit(SOC)
1st BN, 8th Marines Regiment

Combined Joint Special Operations Task Force-West (TF Dagger)
 5th Special Forces Group
1st BN,124th Infantry Regiment – FLNG
Charlie Co,2nd BN,14th Infantry Regiment – (10th Mountain Division), Attached
Task Force 14
B Sqdn, 22 Special Air Service Regiment
D Sqdn, 22 Special Air Service Regiment
Task Forces 7
M Sqdn, Special Boat Service
Task Forces 64
1 Sqdn, Special Air Service Regiment
Coy, 4th Bn, Royal Australian Regiment (later became the 2nd Commando Regiment)
Task Force 20
C Sqdn, 1st Special Forces Operational Detachment-Delta
D Sqdn, 1st Special Forces Operational Detachment-Delta
? Sqdn, Naval Special Warfare Development Group
75th Ranger Regiment
Naval Special Warfare Task Group - Central
SEAL Team 3
SEAL Team 5
SEAL Team 8
SEAL Team 10
Plt, SEAL Delivery Vehicle Team 1
Special Boat Team 12
Special Boat Team 20 
GROM

Iraqi Armed Forces
Saddam Hussein was the supreme armed forces commander.

Iraqi Army
Chief of Staff: Ibrahim Abd al-Sattar Muhammad Ahmed
Northern Iraq
I Corps – Kirkuk City
2nd Infantry Division – Alrabee
5th Mechanized Division – Shuwan
38th Infantry Division – Quader Karam
V corps – Mosul
1st Mechanized Division – Makhmur
4th Infantry Division – Maonten
7th Infantry Division – Alton Kopri Castle
16th Infantry Division – Saddam Dam
Eastern Iraq
II Corps – Deyala
3rd Armoured Division – Jalawia
15th Infantry Division – Amerli
34th Infantry Division – Khanaqin
Southern Iraq
III Corps– Nasseria
6th Armoured Division – Majnoon
11th Infantry Division – Al Naserria
51st Mechanized Division – Zubair
IV corps – AL Amara
10th Armoured Division – AL Teab
14th Infantry Division – Al Amara
18th Infantry Division – Al Musharah

Republican Guard
Under the supervision of Qusay Hussein, commanded by Staff General Sayf al-Din Taha al-Rawi.
I Corps of the Republican Guards
Al Medina Armored Division; 2nd, 10th and 14th Brigades.
Baghdad Mechanized Division; including the 4th, 5th, and 6th Motorized Brigades.
Adnan Infantry Division; 11th, 12th, 21st, and Divisional Artillery Brigades.
II Corps of the Republican Guards
 Al Nida Armored Division; 41st, 42nd, 43rd Brigades.
 Nebuchadnezzer Mechanized Division; 19th, 22nd and 23rd Brigades.
  Hammurabi Armoured Division - possibly with Western Desert Force; 8th, 9th Mechanized Brigades, 18th Armored, Division Artillery Brigade.

Special Republican Guard
Under the supervision of Qusay Hussein, commanded by Major general Kheir-Allah Wahees Omar al-Nassiri. It serves as a Praetorian Guard which is located within Baghdad and is organized to defend the regime.
1st Brigade
2nd Brigade
3rd Brigade
4th Brigade
Armor Command

See also

Iraq War order of battle, 2009

Further reading

References

War on Terror orders of battle
2003 invasion of Iraq
Military operations involving the United States